JQY (or Jewish Queer Youth) is a New York-based nonprofit organization that supports and empowers LGBTQ youth with a focus on those from Orthodox, Chassidic, and Sephardic/Mizrahi homes. The group was founded in 2001 as an online listserve, and began meeting in the Manhattan JCC in 2003.

The organization firmly believes in meeting each individual person where they are. JQY creates spaces for individuals who share the common identities of being LGBTQ and Jewish. Their members have many different views on LGBTQ issues and religion, and all are welcome to share their perspectives and experiences with the group and staff. JQY does not promote a way of life or belief system. The group support members' self-determination, and provides them with support while they explore their own identities, own beliefs, and make life decisions.

JQY's hallmark program is the Drop-in Center for LGBTQ Jewish Teen which is open to anyone who is 13 to 23 years of age.

The organization contributed a video to the It Gets Better Project.

JQY marched with Eshel and other Jewish LGBTQ organizations in the Celebrate Israel Parade of 2012, the first year openly LGBT groups were permitted to participate. Participation in pride parades has been a contentious issue in the Orthodox LGBTQ community.

In 2017 top Jewish musicians, such as Matisyahu, Neshama Carlebach and Eli Schwebel performed in support of JQY.

JQY's crisis warm-line can be reached via call or text at 551-JQY-HOPE (551-579-4673). Contact this number to speak with one of JQY's licensed mental health professionals.

Recent research suggests that JQY successfully helps their members build an essential peer network and negotiate tensions between religion and sexual orientation.

References

External links 
 Official website

Jewish organizations based in the United States
Religious organizations based in the United States
LGBT and Judaism
LGBT organizations in the United States
LGBT Orthodox Jewish organizations
Gay Orthodox Jewish organizations